Xpat Magazine was a quarterly all-English arts and culture publication based in Tainan, Taiwan.  Xpat Magazine was founded by Matt Gibson as an e-zine in February 2003.  Gibson edited and managed the magazine until he sold it to a group of expatriates in September, 2007.

Xpat Magazine published various creative and journalistic writings by Taiwan's expatriate community, and was most noted for its coverage of obscure Taiwanese traditions and cultural practices and directory of English-speaking businesses in Taiwan and its emphasis on photojournalism.

The first print edition of Xpat Magazine was launched in December 2003.  It was distributed free in foreign business Taiwan-wide.  Print editions of the magazine were published quarterly from December 2004 until the December 2008 when the publication reverted to e-zine format.

Staff photographers for Xpat Magazine included Chris Scott, Richard Matheson, Pawl English and Steven Vigar.

References
Brownlow, Robert, "Magazines get a good read on foreigners", June 23, 2006. "The Taipei Times", pg. 14
The Real Taiwan
XpatMatt.com

2003 establishments in Taiwan
2008 disestablishments in Taiwan
Defunct magazines published in Taiwan
Magazines established in 2003
Magazines disestablished in 2008
Magazines published in Taiwan
Mass media in Tainan
Online magazines with defunct print editions
Quarterly magazines
Visual arts magazines